The Temptation of Barbizon is a French fantasy-romance film from 1946, directed by Jean Stelli, written by André-Paul Antoine and Marc-Gilbert Sauvajon, and starring Simone Renant and François Périer. It was the first film of French actor Louis de Funès, who appeared in a 40-second, uncredited role.

Plot 
Martine and Michel are very much in love and have decided to get married, but one evening, their love is put to the test. Two messengers, a demon and an angel, come to their house. Ben Atkinson (the demon) comes first and offers Michel a good job and money. Martine suspects a trick, but Michel is ready to accept the demon's offer. The angel tries to go for help but is stopped by devil, who uses policemen to back him up. At the end, the angel prevents the demon's plans.

Funès debut 
De Funès began his show business career in the theatre. In 1945, thanks to his contact with Daniel Gélin, he made his film debut at the age of 31 with a bit part in La Tentation de Barbizon. De Funès' appeared on screen for 40 seconds in the role of the porter of the cabaret Le Paradis. De Funès receives the character of Jérôme Chambon at the entrance of the cabaret and invites him to enter by a downstairs door, saying "C'est par ici Monsieur" ("This way, sir"). Chambon declines the invitation, wanting to try to enter through the front door of the room instead, but since that door is closed, he crashes into it. De Funès then says: "Ben, il a son compte celui-là, aujourd'hui" ("He's had enough today, that one").

Production details 
The film was produced by the Consortium du Production and filmed at the Studio du Bologne. It was distributed in German theatres by the Internationale Filmallianz (1948) under the title Wenn der Himmel versagt – Der Satan und die Hochzeitsreise ("When the Heavens Fail – Satan and the Honeymoon").

Cast 
 Simone Renant : Eva Parker / Angel
 François Périer : Ben Atkinson / Devil
 Pierre Larquey : Jérôme Chambon
 Juliette Faber : Martine
 Daniel Gélin : Michel
 Henri Crémieux : Eva Parker's advocate
 Myno Burnay : Dominique Ancelin, the society's director
 André Bervil : Mr. Stéphane, the gambling gangster 
 Jean Wall : the custodial judge 
 Jean Berton : the hotel director
 Louis de Funès : hotel porter (uncredited)

References

External links 
 
 Images
 

1946 films
1940s romantic fantasy films
French romantic comedy films
1940s French-language films
Films directed by Jean Stelli
French black-and-white films
1940s French films